Following is the List of different leaders and  officials in the Indian government, along with their respective position or designation in the Indian order of precedence and the salaries and various allowances and emoluments given to them according to the government act.

Chief Ministers, MLAs and MLCs 
The net salary of the Chief Ministers varies from state to state. The following table shows the basic pay of CM of each state of India in decreasing order from top to bottom.

Salaries of MLAs & MLCs
The net salary of the Member of Legislative Assembly/Member of Legislative Council varies from state to state. The following table shows the basic pay of MLA/MLC in each state of India.

Notes

References 

India
Office holders
India
Salaries of office-holders
India government-related lists
India government officials